The 1999 Berlin state election was held on 10 October 1999 to elect the members of the 14th Abgeordnetenhaus of Berlin. The incumbent grand coalition between the Christian Democratic Union (CDU) and Social Democratic Party (SPD) retained government. CDU leader Eberhard Diepgen was re-elected as Mayor.

Parties
The table below lists parties represented in the 13th Abgeordnetenhaus of Berlin.

Opinion polling

Election result

|-
! colspan="2" | Party
! Votes
! %
! +/-
! Seats 
! +/-
! Seats %
|-
| bgcolor=| 
| align=left | Christian Democratic Union (CDU)
| align=right| 637,311
| align=right| 40.8
| align=right| 3.4
| align=right| 76
| align=right| 11
| align=right| 45.0
|-
| bgcolor=| 
| align=left | Social Democratic Party (SPD)
| align=right| 349,731
| align=right| 22.4
| align=right| 1.2
| align=right| 42
| align=right| 13
| align=right| 24.9
|-
| bgcolor=| 
| align=left | Party of Democratic Socialism (PDS)
| align=right| 276,869
| align=right| 17.7
| align=right| 3.1
| align=right| 33
| align=right| 1
| align=right| 19.5
|-
| bgcolor=| 
| align=left | Alliance 90/The Greens (Grüne)
| align=right| 155,322
| align=right| 9.9
| align=right| 3.3
| align=right| 18
| align=right| 12
| align=right| 10.7
|-
! colspan=8|
|-
| bgcolor=| 
| align=left | The Republicans (REP)
| align=right| 41,814
| align=right| 2.7
| align=right| 0.0
| align=right| 0
| align=right| ±0
| align=right| 0
|-
| bgcolor=| 
| align=left | Free Democratic Party (FDP)
| align=right| 34,280
| align=right| 2.2
| align=right| 0.3
| align=right| 0
| align=right| ±0
| align=right| 0
|-
|  
| align=left | The Grays – Gray Panthers (Graue)
| align=right| 17,559
| align=right| 1.1
| align=right| 0.6
| align=right| 0
| align=right| ±0
| align=right| 0
|-
| bgcolor=|
| align=left | Human Environment Animal Protection
| align=right| 16,732
| align=right| 1.1
| align=right| New
| align=right| 0
| align=right| New
| align=right| 0
|-
| bgcolor=|
| align=left | Others
| align=right| 33,958
| align=right| 2.2
| align=right| 
| align=right| 0
| align=right| ±0
| align=right| 0
|-
! align=right colspan=2| Total
! align=right| 1,563,576
! align=right| 100.0
! align=right| 
! align=right| 169
! align=right| 37
! align=right| 
|-
! align=right colspan=2| Voter turnout
! align=right| 
! align=right| 65.5
! align=right| 3.1
! align=right| 
! align=right| 
! align=right| 
|}

References

State election, 1999
Berlin state election
State election
Berlin state election